Soap on a Rope is an invention that consists of a bar of toilet soap that is molded around a small loop of rope. The user is meant to place the rope loop over their head or around their wrist to prevent the soap bar from falling to the floor.

As a novelty gift, it may be given as a humorous reference to not "dropping the soap" in prison showers, a reference to prison rape.

References

External links
Soap-on-a-rope.com

Novelty items
Cleaning products
Year of introduction missing
Soaps